The 2020–21 Bucknell Bison women's basketball team will represent the Bucknell University Bison during the 2020–21 NCAA Division I women's basketball season. The Bison will be led by second-year head coach Trevor Woodruff and play their home games at Sojka Pavilion as members of the Patriot League.

Previous season
They finished the previous season 24–6, 16–2 in Patriot League play to finish in first place. They advanced to the Semifinals of the Patriot League Tournament before it was cancelled due to the COVID-19 pandemic. The NCAA tournament and NIT were also cancelled due to the pandemic.

Roster

Schedule

|-
!colspan=9 style=| Non-conference regular season
|-
!colspan=9 style=| Patriot League regular season

|-
!colspan=12 style=| Patriot League Tournament
|-

See also
2020–21 Bucknell Bison men's basketball team

References

Bucknell
Bucknell Bison women's basketball seasons